Baywood is a hamlet and census-designated place (CDP) in the Town of Islip in Suffolk County, on Long Island, in New York, United States. The population was 7,350 at the 2010 census.

Geography

Demographics

As of the census of 2000, there were 7,571 people, 2,252 households, and 1,880 families residing in the CDP. The population density was 3,371.0 per square mile (1,299.2/km2). There were 2,317 housing units at an average density of 1,031.6/sq mi (397.6/km2). The racial makeup of the CDP was 74.49% White, 9.60% African American, 0.25% Native American, 1.84% Asian, 0.07% Pacific Islander, 10.12% from other races, and 3.63% from two or more races. Hispanic or Latino of any race were 23.23% of the population.

There were 2,252 households, out of which 38.3% had children under the age of 18 living with them, 61.1% were married couples living together, 15.9% had a female householder with no husband present, and 16.5% were non-families. 12.2% of all households were made up of individuals, and 4.5% had someone living alone who was 65 years of age or older. The average household size was 3.35 and the average family size was 3.56.

In the CDP, the population was spread out, with 27.2% under the age of 18, 8.0% from 18 to 24, 34.5% from 25 to 44, 20.9% from 45 to 64, and 9.4% who were 65 years of age or older. The median age was 35 years. For every 100 females, there were 97.0 males. For every 100 females age 18 and over, there were 93.8 males.

The median income for a household in the CDP was $60,294, and the median income for a family was $62,037. Males had a median income of $39,926 versus $30,609 for females. The per capita income for the CDP was $20,978. About 5.2% of families and 5.5% of the population were below the poverty line, including 5.6% of those under age 18 and 3.5% of those age 65 or over.

Education 
Baywood is located entirely within the boundaries of (and is thus served by) the Brentwood Union Free School District. As such, all children who reside within the hamlet and attend public schools go to Brentwood's schools.

References

Islip (town), New York
Census-designated places in New York (state)
Hamlets in New York (state)
Census-designated places in Suffolk County, New York
Hamlets in Suffolk County, New York